Alessio Boggiatto (born 18 December 1981) is a former Italian medley swimmer.

Biography
Born at Moncalieri, Boggiatto specialized in 400 m medley, winning several European Championship medals and one World Championship title in that distance. He participated for Italy in the Summer Olympic of Sydney 2000, Athens 2004 and Beijing 2008 achieving the 4th place three times in a row.

He is a sibling of Chiara Boggiatto, also a swimmer.

See also
 Italian swimmers multiple medalists at the international competitions

References

External links
 

1981 births
Living people
People from Moncalieri
Male medley swimmers
Italian male swimmers
Olympic swimmers of Italy
Swimmers at the 2000 Summer Olympics
Swimmers at the 2004 Summer Olympics
Swimmers at the 2008 Summer Olympics
World Aquatics Championships medalists in swimming
European Aquatics Championships medalists in swimming
Mediterranean Games silver medalists for Italy
Swimmers at the 2005 Mediterranean Games
Mediterranean Games medalists in swimming
Sportspeople from the Metropolitan City of Turin